Variimorda is a subgenus of beetles in the family Mordellidae, containing the following species:

Species
 Variimorda argyropleura (Franciscolo, 1942)
 Variimorda basalis (Costa, 1854)
 Variimorda briantea (Comolli, 1837)
 Variimorda flavimana (Marseul, 1876)
 Variimorda holzschuhi Horák, 1985
 Variimorda ihai Chûjô, 1959
 Variimorda inomatai Takakuwa, 1985
 Variimorda ishiharai Kiyoyama, 1994
 Variimorda kurosawai Takakuwa, 2001
 Variimorda mendax Méquignon, 1946
 Variimorda persica Horák, 1985
 Variimorda quomoi (Franciscolo, 1942)
 Variimorda ragusai (Emery, 1876)
 Variimorda shiyakei Horak, 1996
 Variimorda truncatopyga (Pic, 1938)
 Variimorda villosa (Schrank, 1781)

References

Mordellidae
Insect subgenera